Aleksey Skvernyuk (born 13 October 1985) is a Belarusian former football player.

International career
Skvernyuk has played for Belarus national football team seven times.

External links
Aleksey Skvernyuk player info at the official Krylia Sovetov website 

1985 births
Living people
Belarusian footballers
Belarusian expatriate footballers
Belarus international footballers
Association football midfielders
Footballers from Minsk
Expatriate footballers in Russia
Russian Premier League players
FC Energetik-BGU Minsk players
PFC Krylia Sovetov Samara players
FC Kuban Krasnodar players
PFC Spartak Nalchik players
FC Slavia Mozyr players
FC Ufa players
FC Smorgon players
FC Belshina Bobruisk players